Sarfarāz Khān (c. 1700 – 29 April 1740), born Mīrza Asadullāh, was a Nawab of Bengal. Sarfaraz Khan's maternal grandfather, Nawab Murshid Quli Khan of Bengal (Bengal, Bihar and Orissa) nominated him as the direct heir to him as there was no direct heir. After Murshid Quli's death in 1727, Sarfaraz ascended to the Masnad (throne) of the Nawab. Sarfaraz's father, Shuja-ud-Din Muhammad Khan, then the Subahdar of Orissa, getting to know it arrived at Murshidabad, the capital of the Nawabs of Bengal with a huge army. To avoid a conflict in the family the dowager Begum of the Nawab asked Shuja-ud-Din to ascend to the Masnad after Sarfaraz abdicated in favour of his father. However, circumstances led Shuja-ud-Din to nominate Sarfaraz as his heir and after Shuja-us-Din's death in 1739, Sarfaraz Khan again ascended to the Masnad as the Nawab of Bengal (Bengal, Bihar and Orissa).

Early life and succession
Born Mirza Asadullah, sometime after 1700, Sarfaraz Khan Dakhni was the son of Shuja-ud-Din Muhammad Khan by his wife Zinat-un-nisa Begum. Sarfaraz Khan was the maternal grandson of Nawab Murshid Quli Khan of Bengal who died on 30 June 1727. In absence of a direct heir, Murshid Khan nominated Sarfaraz Khan to succeed him. Thus, Sarfaraz Khan ascended to the Masnad (throne) as the Nawab in 1727 before abdicating in favour of his father Shuja-ud-Din Muhammad Khan in the same year. On hearing of Sarfaraz's accession to the Masnad, Shuja-ud-Din Muhammad Khan, the Diwan Nazim of Orissa, marched at the head of a large army towards Murshidabad. To avoid a conflict in the family, the dowager Begum of Murshid Quli Khan intervened; and her son-in-law Shuja-ud-Din ascended to the Masnad of Bengal. By August 1727, Shuja-ud-Din was firmly established and recognised as the second Nawab of Bengal.

Shujauddin appointed Sarfaraz as the Naib Nazim of Bihar. In 1734, Sarfaraz Khan succeeded his cousin, Mirza Lutfullah Tabrizi, as the Naib Nazim of Jahangirnagar (Dhaka). Instead of moving to Dhaka, Khan appointed Ghalib Ali Khan and Jaswant Rai as the Diwan. During his tenure, the city of Jahangirnagar saw rapid economic growth through agriculture and trade - the greatest since the time of Governor Shaista Khan.

But as fate had, circumstances lead Shuja-ud-Din to nominate his son, Sarfaraz again as his heir and successor and after Shuja-ud-Din died on 26 August 1739 Sarfaraz Khan again ascended to the Masnad as the Nawab of Bengal on 13 March 1739 with the title of Ala-ud-Din Haidar Jang.

Reign
Known to be an extremely pious, religious and moderate ruler he left the administration into the hands of his Nazims and Naib Nazims. Religious matters was his priority. This neglect in administrative matters resulted the gradual rise of Alivardi Khan the Nazim of Azimabad (Patna).

Sarfaraz Khan became the Diwan of Bengal for sometime early into the reign of his father Shuja-ud-Din Muhammad Khan and later became the Nazim of Jahangir Nagar (Dhaka). Sarfaraz, however, did never live in Dhaka and administered it by his adviser Syed Galib Ali Khan. This was because of his disinterest in administrative and economic matters. Such negligence would cost him dearly towards the end of his life.

Sarfaraz Khan was a pious man, full of the outward forms of devotion, and extremely regular in his stated prayers and ablutions. He moreover fasted three full months besides the blessed month of Ramzan, and was scrupulous in the discharge of the several forms of worship to be attended to at different periods throughout the year. He was, however, totally deficient in those great qualities of mind, so indispensably necessary in sovereigns. Wholly engrossed in the little forms of religion, he neglected the affairs of state, and paid no attention to the observance of those duties requisite in a man of his high station and rank. It is true, he offered no injury to the persons of Ray-Rayan, Alam Chand, the Dewan of his father, nor to Jagat Seth or Haji Ahmed, his two other ministers, the latter, men of great abilities and influence, who, together with the Ray-Rayan, had the absolute direction of affairs in the late reign ; but he resigned the reins of government into the hands of a few interested men, who had personal wrongs to revenge.

Among these were Haji Lutfullah, Mardan Ali Khan, Mir Murtaza, and others, who, long incensed against Haji Ahmed, depreciated his character everywhere, and insulted him with taunting expressions. These incensed noblemen, intent on giving vent to their enmity and hatred against Haji Ahmed, caused caricatures to be drawn of him, and eventually effected in Sarfaraz Khan's mind a total alienation of regard towards him. Haji Ahmed was accordingly removed from the office of Dewan, which he had held ever since Shuja-ud-Din Muhammad Khan's accession ; and the office was now bestowed on Mir Murtaza. The viceroy wanted also to deprive Ataullah Khan, son-in-law of the Haji, of the military command of Rajmahal, to give it to his own son-in-law Hassan Muhammad Khan.

Intrigues in his Durbar
Haji Ahmed dreading the influence of his numerous enemies, endeavoured to gain strength to oppose them; he therefore wrote every thing to his brother Alivardi Khan, magnifying trifles exceedingly in the representation. Haji Ahmed had the art, too, to persuade the new viceroy to disband great part of his forces, and otherwise to retrench his expenses. Advice so consonant to his feelings was adopted without hesitation ; but while he listened to the counsel of Haji Ahmed to effect reduction, he allowed the arrest of Haji Ahmed's two sons Zain-ud-Din Ahmed Khan, who was on the road from Patna (Azimabad), and Ahmed Khan, who had just arrived from his command of Rangpur.

 Sarfaraz Khan now set on foot an inquiry into the management of the public revenue of Azimabad (Patna), and recalled the troops that had been placed by his father under Alivardi Khan, and for whom during many years they had conceived an attachment. On their seeming to hesitate about being removed, he resumed the grant of land which his father Shuja bestowed on them. All these acts were minutely reported by Haji Ahmed, and assiduously transmitted to his brother Alivardi Khan with the usual exaggeration ; and to give more weight to his own assertions, he used to superadd the testimony of his son Ahmed Khan, who on such occasions submitted to the influence of paternal authority.

Conspiracy of Alivardi Khan
Alivardi Khan daily informed of these events, resolved to avail himself of his acquaintance and connection with his friend Ishaq Khan, at the court of Dehli, a nobleman who was now in complete possession of the Mughal Emperor's ear. He wrote him a secret letter, in which he requested to have the patents of the three provinces transferred to himself, under promise of sending to court a present of a crore (ten million) of rupees, besides the whole of Sarfaraz Khan's wealth. To effect this, he required an imperial commission directed to himself, empowering him to wrest the three provinces out of the hands of the present viceroy, Sarfaraz Khan. After having dispatched these letters, he gave out that he intended marching against the zamindars of Bhojpur, and under that pretence he mustered his troops, which he always kept in constant readiness. At the same time, he had the art to give Sarfaraz Khan public notice of his project, though he in reality waited ready to avail himself of the first opportunity to effect his true purpose.

At length, ten months after Nadir-shah's departure for Persia, and just thirteen months after Shuja-ud-Din Muhammad Khan's decease, he received the imperial commission, drawn up in the style he had requested. Being now resolved on marching against Sarfaraz Khan, he wrote secretly to Jagat Seth and Fateh Chand, that on a certain day he would commence his march. In March 1740; Alivardi Khan, set out for Murshidabad, on the context of expedition to Bhojpur, and encamped at some distance from the city of Patna.

Alivardi Khan in a message to Sarfaraz Khan suggested that he was not marching on him but was arriving to pay homage to the Nawab. Initially satisfied, Sarfaraz Khan eventually decided to march on the head of his army and arrived at the town of Comrah on 9 April 1740. Alivardi in the interim, secured the Teliagarhi pass and camped at Rajmahal. The Nawab's army was being led by a seasoned general, Ghaus Khan and Ray-Rayan, Alam Chand also accompanied. The rebel army was being led by Alivardi Khan with Nandalal and Nawazish Muhammad Khan as his deputies.

They opposing armies marched on to Giria (Battle of Giria), a village on the banks of the river Bhagirathi for a showdown on 26 April 1740.

Defeat, death and succession

Sarfaraz was stark unlucky to have an opponent like Alivardi who besides being an excellent leader even at the age of 70, knew Sarfaraz's weaknesses. Sarfaraz Khan was defeated and killed in the Battle of Giria on the banks of the river Bhagirathi. The incumbent Alivardi Khan, the Nazim of Azimabad (Patna) defeated him in a direct conflict. The battle was short but bloody and intense given the "loyalty standards" of the time. The outcome was decided early by Sarfaraz Khan falling to a bullet. The remnants of his army continued to put up a brave resistance but Alivardi Khan was too good a general for them.

The primary cause for this debacle was that Sarfaraz never saw what was coming in the form of Alivardi Khan and did not take precautionary measures in time. Besides, Alivardi did not give him much time to settle down. Sarfaraz was more concerned of the "bigger threat" Nadir Shah who was vandalising Delhi and Punjab. Nadir had in fact written to Sarfaraz which aggravated matters further. He can be best described as mild mannered person who neither had the opportunity nor the exceptional merit required to leave a "mark" on history on such troubled times and was consigned to the footnotes of history.

Sarfaraz Khan's reign was for a little over 13 months. The Nasiri Dynasty of Murshid Quli Khan ended with the death of Sarfaraz Khan. Sarfaraz Khan had five sons and five daughters who never made it to the doors of power thus Alivardi Khan toppled the Nasiri Nawabs and became the new Nawab of Bengal. Alivardi Khan also founded the Afshar Dynasty. He lies buried at Naginabag in Murshidabad.

According to the Archaeological Survey of India, the Tomb of Nawab Sarfraz Khan at Naginabagh is a  State Protected Monument (Item no S-WB-80).

See also
 List of rulers of Bengal
 History of Bengal
 History of Bangladesh
 History of India
 Shia Islam in India

References

External links
  Site dedicated to Nawab Sarfaraz Khan

Year of birth missing
Nawabs of Bengal
1740 deaths
Rulers of Dhaka
People from Murshidabad district